Rochelle Woods (born 1999), also known as Rochy Woods, is an English player of English billiards. She was runner-up in the 2015 World Women's Billiards Championship.

Early life
Woods took her GCSEs at Litcham School before going to study for a BTEC award in sports coaching. She has a twin sister called Tiffany and prefers to be known as Rochy rather than Rochelle.

Woods started playing billiards at the age of ten, having been introduced to the sport by her coach Phillip Welham at a taster day. She entered the English Under 16 Billiards Championship in 2013 and lost to the eventual champion James Eyre by 10 points.

Career
Woods entered the English Girls Billiards Championship for the first time in 2010 at only 11 years old, and lost in the final to Hannah Jones of Derby. 
Jones also defeated Rochy in the final in 2013, before she won her first National Girls Championship defeating Josie Wright (Thetford) 115–98 in the 2014 final.
In 2015, Woods beat Hannah Greeno (Narborough) to win the English Girls' Billiards event, and later in the year qualified from the round-robin stage for the final of the World Women's Billiards Championship, held at the Northern Snooker Centre, Leeds. Emma Bonney won the title for the tenth time, defeating Woods 334–119 in the final. Northern Snooker Centre, Leeds

Woods won the 2016 English Girls' Billiards title by beating Greeno in the final again. She was also a losing semi-finalist in the National Junior (under 19s)   championship, losing 108–113 to Nathan Boughren. At the 2016 World Women's Billiards Championship, Woods lost all four of her matches, to Bonney, Revanna Umadevi, Gaye Jones and Eva Palmius.

The following year, aged 18 in 2017, Woods gained her fourth national title after defeating Brittany Chambers 152–48 in the final, and was also a losing semi-finalist in the National Junior (under 19s)Billiards championship again. At the 2017 Women's World Championship, she failed to qualify despite recording a 178–166 win over eventual champion Emma Bonney.

In March 2020 Rochy won the first ever holdings of the Norfolk Women's Billiards Championship defeating Jazmin Cainey (Narborough) in the final and the Norfolk Women's Snooker Championship defeating Emma Powers-Richardson (Norwich) in the final.
In October Woods won the Eastern Counties Women's Billiards Championship defeating Cambridgshire's Brittany Chambers and was Runner-up in the Eastern Counties Women's Snooker Championship losing to Lauren Macnamee (Ipswich).

Woods was believed to be the youngest ever qualified WPBSA Worldsnooker coach when she qualified in 2015 at the age of 16, and two years later in 2017 established her own Junior Coaching Academy based at the Maltings Q Club, King's Lynn. 
Since 2017 she has coached in excess of 50 players at the Junior Academy in both English Billiards and Snooker.

Woods was also made Lead Coach for the Narbeck Boys Billiards League in 2020, joining the Coaching team of Dave Brown and Head of Coaching Phillip Welham. 
She also works with the Norfolk Billiards and Snooker Association helping to introduce their Development structure to West Norfolk.

Notable achievements

References

1999 births
Living people
English players of English billiards
English snooker players
Female players of English billiards
Female snooker players